Abdellah Lahoua (born 19 July 1986) is a Moroccan footballer. He usually plays as midfielder. Lahoua is currently attached to Nahdat Berkane.

Lahoua played for the "B" Morocco national football team entering as a second-half substitute in a 2009 African Championship of Nations qualifying match against Algeria on 17 May 2008.

See also
Football in Morocco
List of football clubs in Morocco

References

1986 births
Living people
Moroccan footballers
Difaâ Hassani El Jadidi players
AS FAR (football) players
People from El Jadida
RS Berkane players
Association football midfielders